Khagan (Qaghan) was a title used by the Turkic people of the Medieval Ages. The First and Second Turkic Khaganate were empires ruled by the Ashina tribe of the Göktürks that controlled much of Central Asia and the Mongolian Plateau between 552 and 745 and composed of confederated Turkic tribes. Their history is turbulent. In the 6th century, they challenged the power of numerous dynasties in the Central Plains. At the end of the century following a civil war, the khaganate was divided into eastern and western wings. In the second half of the 7th century, both wings were defeated by the Tang dynasty. However, in 682 they regained their independence.

Khagans of the Turkic Khaganate

Khagans of the western side of the Turkic Khaganate

Khagans of Apa line

Khagans of the Eastern Turkic Khaganate

Khagans under the Jimi system of Tang dynasty

Khagans of the Western Turkic Khaganate

Xingxiwang Khagans

Jiwangjue Khagans

Khagans of the Second Eastern Turkic Khaganate

Sources

Lists of monarchs
Turkic dynasties
Göktürk khagans